In the Chicago mayoral election of 1893, Democrat Carter Harrison Sr. won election, returning him the mayor's office for a (then-record) fifth non-consecutive term as mayor of Chicago. Harrison won a majority of the vote, defeating the Republican nominee, businessman Samuel W. Allerton, by a ten point margin. He also defeated two third-party candidates: United Citizens nominee DeWitt Clinton Cregier (a previous Democrat mayor) and Socialist Labor Party nominee Henry Ehrenpreis, neither of whom received strong support.

Ahead of the general election, Harrison had faced opposition in his race to receive the Democratic Party's nomination. Both former mayor Cregier and Illinois Staats-Zeitung newspaper editor and former Cook County deputy sheriff Washington Hesing also sought the Democratic nomination at the party's convention.

Background
The election took place against the backdrop of the city's preparations for the World's Columbian Exposition, to be held later that year. 

Carter Harrison Sr. had previously served as Mayor of Chicago for four terms, from 1879 through 1887. In 1891, Harrison came out of political retirement and ran unsuccessfully as a third-party candidate for mayor of Chicago, after having first unsuccessfully challenged then-incumbent DeWitt Clinton Cregier for the Democratic nomination.

Since the 1891 election, Harrison had made peace again with the Democratic Party, supporting its 1892 presidential nominee Grover Cleveland. However, Harrison never had a particularly strong relation with Cleveland, and by the time of the 1893 election, the two had drawn a rift over Harrison's disagreement with Cleveland's stance on the silver issue. In addition, Harrison had a longstanding feud with Michael C. McDonald, then an influential figure in Chicago Democratic politics.

Harrison had made a number of moves that would assist him in his 1893 mayoral campaign. First, he purchased the Chicago Times, which he used to promote his political agenda and would also use to support his political ambitions. He also founded the Carter H. Harrison Democratic Association. This organization was presented as an endeavor to encourage good governance, but it was instead the start of a political organization that would become a formal faction of the city's Democratic Party, rivaling the more informal organization headed by Roger Charles Sullivan  and John Patrick Hopkins.

Nominations

Democratic
By early 1893, Carter Harrison Sr.'s campaign was full fledged. As in 1891, his campaign manager was Adolf Kraus. They made an effort to ignite ward level excitement for Harrison by utilizing local branches of the Harrison Democratic Association.

Harrison entered the race without the support of significant organized groups or newspapers (other than the Chicago Times, which he owned).

Harrison quickly gained momentum. This troubled many establishment Democrats, such as Roger Charles Sullivan and John Patrick Hopkins, who were concerned that the charismatic Harrison would come to dominate the party if he was successful at winning the mayoralty.

Since then-President-elect Grover Cleveland and Harrison had fallen-out over the issue of silver, and since Hopkins was considered to be the leader of the Cleveland wing of the local Democratic Party, Hopkins took charge in seeking to block Harrison's pursuit of the mayoralty.

John Patrick Hopkins and his political partner Roger Charles Sullivan looked at several prospective candidates to challenge Harrison for the nomination. Dewitt Clinton Cregier had been talking about potentially running again, but he was not seen as likely to win. Ultimately, Hopkins settled on Illinois Staats-Zeitung editor and former Cook County deputy sheriff Washington Hesing.

Hopkins served as Hesing's campaign manager, while Sullivan helped Hesing organize at the ward level. Hesing was also baked by Michael C. McDonald and John Coughlin.

Despite these efforts to stop Harrison, he continued to pick up momentum. Harrison had garnered the backing of many of the city's influential Democratic figures, including John Powers and James H. Farrell. Harrison as supported by a vast array of ward clubs and sub-factions of the city's Democratic electorate.

Hessing suffered from the fact that many voters, including nativists and including many Irish American voters, held resentments against Germans, viewing them as anarchists and socialists and associating them negatively with incumbent governor Atgeld.

Hesing accused Harrison of being supported by "corrupt use of money", accusing him of accepting $30,000 from the railroads in return for pledging not to enforce then-pending City Council ordinances that would require the railroads to undertake the expensive step of elevating their tracks to eliminate level crossings.

While Hesing ran a tough campaign against Harrison, Harrison took a strong lead.

The primary to elect delegates to the city nominating convention was held on February 27. Harrison won a strong victory, winning at least three-quarters of the delegates. Hesing lodged accusations of voter fraud against Harrisonites.

At the convention, held at the Central Music Hall, three candidates had their names put forth for the nomination, Harrison, Hesing, and Cregier. Harrison won on the first ballot, receiving 531 delegate votes to Cregier's 93 and Hesing's 57. 

The John Powers-led wing of the party had packed the convention with loud Harrison supporters, and the convention had seen fistfights break out across the room. The Chicago Tribune had dubbed it the, "most disorderly and riotous" convention in the city's history. Hesing, who was heckled during his address, stormed out of the hall.

Republican
The Republican Party nominated Samuel W. Allerton.

The Republicans had sought to recruit a top-capitalist figure of the city to face Harrison in the general election, but had failed in their attempts to persuade Philip Danforth Armour or Lyman J. Gage to run.

United Citizens
The United Citizens party nominated former mayor DeWitt Clinton Cregier. The United Citizens party was founded by Chicago Daily News publisher Victor Lawson.

Socialist Labor
The Socialist Labor Party nominated Henry Ehrenpreis.

General election
The race was considered to have been one of the most rancorous in Chicago's history. Willis J. Abbot wrote that, "the bitterness and acrimony of the campaign exceeded anything ever known in Chicago politics."

Harrison was regarded to be an underdog in the race. The city elite largely considered Harrison to be too liberal and believed that he allowed himself to be surrounded by corrupt associates. Thus, Allerton, a conservative Republican, received broad backing from the city elite and nearly all of the city's newspapers.

In the past fourteen years (dating back to Harrison's first mayoral victory in 1879), Republicans had only won two mayoral elections. However, in this era, mayoral races in Chicago were still typically closely contested, and Republicans usually carried the city in national elections.

Michael C. McDonald attempted to reconcile with Harrison, offering Harrison his support. Harrison rejected his offer. Despite this, rumors persisted that Harrison had received McDonald's support in exchange for agreeing that, as mayor, he would provide McDonald a license to operate the Garfield Park racetrack.

Harrison pledged that he would run an honest campaign against Allerton.

Harrison reportedly spent $500,000 in his campaign effort. He benefited from a well-run campaign operation.

Many voters believed that the charismatic Harrison was the best choice to be the "face" of the city during the World's Fair, thinking that he was the best option to serve as the city's ambassador to the world during the course of the exposition. Others, however, believed that Harrison's leadership style was better adapted to the past, when Chicago was a burgeoning metropolis. They believed that hosting the World's Fair indicated that the city had reached a stage of maturity in its development and that Harrison was ill-suited to lead the city at such a stage.

Allerton was seen as a reluctant candidate. He was seen as lacking in moxie as a candidate.

Allerton campaigned as portraying himself as a businessman rather than a politician. Allerton stated that he would run Chicago like a business. Allerton pledged to bring clean government and clean streets. He stated that only professional and business leaders of the "highest standing" would be appointed to office. Allerton argued that the administration of the upcoming World's Fair presented a model for the business-style governance Chicago should adopt. Allerton 

Allerton received backing from the elites that were organizing the World's Fair. He received the backing of the city's business elite, such as Philip Danforth Armour, Lyman J. Gage, Harry Gordon Selfridge, Charles L. Hutchison, Franklin MacVeigh, Harlow Higinbotham, and Turlington Harvey. Deriding Harrison's backers as representing "all the immorality of the city", and contrasting it with his own backing by leading figures of the city, Allerton framed the race as a choice between "the slums" and the men who built modern Chicago.

Allerton's platform advocated civil service reform, improved city services, and lower taxes. However, much of his platform was indistinguishable the urban reform which Harrison had backed during his mayoral tenure. Additionally, Allerton's campaign was more focused on attacking Harrison than it was on extolling the virtues of Allerton's own platform.

Harrison was slandered throughout the campaign. Republicans lodged blame for all of the city's ills on Harrison. Some christian evangelists even tied blame for the Haymarket affair bombing with Harrison's support for allowing saloons to remain open on Sundays.

Harrison effective responded to criticisms of his record by stating that he had done the best he could as mayor with the state-imposed limitations on the city's taxing powers. Harrison campaigned this election on a platform which included reforming the tax assessment system. Meanwhile, Republicans advocated an unrealistic combination of lower taxes and expanded municipal services, unconvincingly arguing that the needed money could be saved by decreasing the number of civil servants by having professional appointees in place of patronage appointees.

In the city's ethnic newspapers, Republicans' contention that the city needed to lower, rather than equalize, the taxes, was criticized as being upper-class men looking out for their own economic interests. Harrison used this line of attack. Harrison also claimed that the Republicans' campaign of "moral uplift" and "good government" was a lightly-disguised attempt to refuse the city's non-protestant immigrant ethnic groups the right to govern until such a tie as they conformed with the Republicans' views of "proper values".

While Chicago Protestant commercial establishment abhorred Harrison's willingness to work with even seedy elements of the city, his willingness to give a voice to "the great unwashed"  in government earned him great admiration in the city's ethnic neighborhoods.

Cregier's candidacy received little regard.

The bitter primary race against Hesing had turned many German voters away from supporting Harrison in the general election.

Both Allerton and Cregier made attempts to paint Harrison as corrupt.

The day of the election, each party felt assured of their chances. On their part, Republicans hoped for an overwhelming victory, with the Chicago Tribune predicting that one would happen due to what they predicted would be massive defections by Democratic-leaning voters in the city's German wards, in which Hesing had been popular.

Results
Harrison won, becoming the first mayor in Chicago history to be elected to a fifth term. His victory was considered a landslide, and his roughly 21,000 vote margin of victory was the greatest of any of Harrison's mayoral victories.

The election result was considered to be a surprise, as most newspapers had predicted Allerton to have been the strong favorite to win the election.

Harrison received 87.87% of the Polish-American vote, while Allerton received only 11.20%.

References

Mayoral elections in Chicago
Chicago
Chicago
1890s in Chicago